Aliabad-e Enqelab (also Romanized as ‘Alīābād-e Enqelāb; also known as ‘Alīābād) is a village in Jafarabad Rural District, Jafarabad District, Qom County, Qom Province, Iran. At the 2006 census, its population was 1,108, in 238 families.

References 

Populated places in Qom Province